The Royal Thai Air Force Special Operations Regiment or Air Force Commando is special forces in the Royal Thai Air Force Security Force Regiment 's Special Combat Operations Squadron, has been in existence since the late 1975s. Part of Royal Thai Air Force, they are based near Don Mueang International Airport and provide anti-hijacking capabilities.

History
In 1975, Thailand was under threat from communism. In the battle area operated by the three armies, faced with various forms of resistance from the communist insurgency forces. In this regard, The Royal Thai Air Force (RTAF) was aware of a plane being shot down in a combat area or behind enemy lines. If the plane is shot down and the pilot escapes, it must be surrounded by the enemy. Therefore, during the overlap between 1975-1976, the RTAF established a search and rescue unit, also known as the Pararescue Jumper (PJ) to perform a mission of attack, search and rescue pilots who have been in combat operations in the battlefield and fell back out of the dangerous area can give those who will be in the PJ unit are only open to personnel affiliated with The Royal Thai Air Force Security Force Command (RTAF Security Force Command) and Directorate of Medical Services Royal Thai Air Force (DMS RTAF). These personnel will be stationed in 2 units were Air Return Center and Search and Rescue Helicopter Squadron. Initially there Only 17 Pararescuemen Jumpers (PJs), and five years later, the First Search and Rescue Officer Course was launched on 19 November 1981, if upon successful completion of the training course, they will be placed in the contain the 201st Helicopter Squadron and 203rd Helicopter Squadron, which is a unit under the Wing 2 located in Lopburi Province.

Meanwhile, in 1976, three Philippine Airlines (PAL) planes were seized by the Moro National Liberation Front (MNLF) forced the captain of the plane to came and stopped in Thailand to transfer to Libya. Three terrorists used 70 passengers as hostages and demanded the Philippine government paid a ransom of $300,000 and released four political prisoners. Philippine Airlines paid the terrorist ransom in cash. The terrorists released 12 hostages, the rest flew to Libya. When the plane made it to Libya, Colonel Muammar Gaddafi stepped in to defuse the situation by negotiating with the terrorists to release the hostages. In the end, the terrorists released the hostages, and Col. Gaddafi coordinated the return of hostages and ransom money to the Philippine Airlines. However, this hijacking incident made the RTAF realize that special operation unit was needed to solve the situation. If something like this happens again in the future, a year later, in 1977, a commando unit was established by giving up directly to the 2nd RTAF Military Police Battalion, Office of Donmuang RTAF Base Commander (ODRTAFBC), and opened the first Commando training course for 17 personnel from the PJ on December 30 of the same year.

In 1985, Commando was established as a Special Operation Company (SOC) under the Special Operation Group (SOG) under the RTAF Security Force Command. In early 1988 a heliborne detachment rescued a Thai fighter pilot shot down along the border during hostilities with Laos. During April–May 1988, 43 members from the unit held Badge Tram 88 field exercises in Thailand with a United States Air Force Combat Control Team.

In 1991, the PJ unit was established as a Search and Rescue Company (SRC) under the Special Operation Group. After that, the SOG was upgraded to become a Special Operations Regiment (SOR). In 1996, when it came to becoming the SOR, and then there was a problem that not enough personnel to carry out the mission, it caused the high-ranking officials involved with the SOR have found a solution by combining 2 courses were Search and rescue and Commando together. Therefore, in 2005 was approved for the establishment of a Special Operation Course since then, and the SOC has been upgraded to a Special Operation Battalion (SOB).

Organization

RTAF: Special Operation Regiment Command.
 RTAF: Command Center 
 RTAF: 1st Special Operation Battalion.  ( Combat Control Team )
 RTAF: Service Support Company.
 RTAF: Combat Signal Platoon.
 RTAF: Ordnance Platoon.
 RTAF: Transportation Platoon.
 RTAF: 1st Special Operations Company. ( Commando )
 RTAF: 1st Special Operations Unit.
 RTAF: 2nd Special Operations Unit.
 RTAF: 3rd Special Operations Unit.
 RTAF: 2nd Special Operations Company. ( Commando )
 RTAF: 1st Special Operations Unit.
 RTAF: 2nd Special Operations Unit.
 RTAF: 3rd Special Operations Unit.
 RTAF: 3rd Special Operations Company. ( Commando )
 RTAF: 1st Special Operations Unit.
 RTAF: 2nd Special Operations Unit.
 RTAF: 3rd Special Operations Unit.
 RTAF:  2nd Special Operation Battalion.  ( Pararescue Jumper )
 RTAF: Service Support Company.
 RTAF: Combat Signal Platoon.
 RTAF: Ordnance Platoon.
 RTAF: Transportation Platoon.
 RTAF: Quartermaster Platoon.
 RTAF: 1st Special Operations Company .
 RTAF: 1st Special Operations Unit.
 RTAF: 2nd Special Operations Unit.
 RTAF: 3rd Special Operations Unit.
 RTAF: 4th Special Operations Unit.
 RTAF: 2nd Special Operations Company.
 RTAF: 1st Special Operations Unit.
 RTAF: 2nd Special Operations Unit.
 RTAF: 3rd Special Operations Unit.
 RTAF: 3rd Special Operations Company.
 RTAF: 1st Special Operations Unit.
 RTAF: 2nd Special Operations Unit.
 RTAF: 3rd Special Operations Unit.
 RTAF:  3rd Special Operation Battalion.  ( Freefall )
 RTAF: Service Support Company.
 RTAF: Combat Signal Platoon.
 RTAF: Ordnance Platoon.
 RTAF: Transportation Platoon.
 RTAF: 1st Special Operations Company. 
 RTAF: 1st Special Operations Unit.
 RTAF: 2nd Special Operations Unit.
 RTAF: 3rd Special Operations Unit.
 RTAF: 2nd Special Operations Company.
 RTAF: 1st Special Operations Unit.
 RTAF: 2nd Special Operations Unit.
 RTAF: 3rd Special Operations Unit.
 RTAF: 3rd Special Operations Company.
 RTAF: 1st Special Operations Unit.
 RTAF: 2nd Special Operations Unit.
 RTAF: 3rd Special Operations Unit.
 RTAF: Aerial Support Company.
 RTAF: Combat Search and Rescue Center (CSAR). ( Pararescuemen )

Land vehicles

References

Royal Thai Air Force
Air force special forces units
Special forces of Thailand
1976 establishments in Thailand
Military units and formations established in 1976